Alberto Tomás Botía Rabasco (born 27 January 1989) is a Spanish professional footballer who plays as a central defender for Saudi Arabian club Al Wehda FC.

He made 140 La Liga appearances, mostly for Sporting de Gijón but also Sevilla, Elche and one for Barcelona, where he started his career. Additionally, he spent four years with Olympiacos, winning the Super League Greece three times.

Club career

Barcelona
Botía was born in Alquerías, Region of Murcia. Aged just eight years old he began playing for CD Beniel, soon joining neighbours Real Murcia and remaining there for three years. In 2003 he moved to FC Barcelona, being inserted into its B team after a further three seasons.

In late May 2009 Botía, alongside fellow youth graduate Marc Muniesa, was first called to the main squad for a UEFA Champions League match against Manchester United. He made his official debut on the 30th, coming on as a second-half substitute for Gerard Piqué in the final game of the campaign, a 1–1 away draw against Deportivo de La Coruña.

Sporting Gijón
On 14 July 2009, Botía was sent to fellow La Liga club Sporting de Gijón on a season-long loan. A regular starter throughout his first year in the top tier, he decided to extend his stay with the Asturians in a four-year deal, with Barcelona keeping a buy-back clause for the first three.

Botía scored his first top-flight goal on 12 September 2010, opening a 2–0 home win over RCD Mallorca. On 14 November, he was sent off in the last minute of a 1–0 loss to Real Madrid also at El Molinón for a foul on Cristiano Ronaldo.

Sevilla
On 8 August 2012, following Sporting's relegation, Botía signed with Sevilla FC for a fee believed to be in the region of €3 million. He was brought in with the help of the Doyen Group, an Anglo-Portuguese investment firm. He made his official debut for his new team 18 days later, playing the second half of a 1–1 away draw against Granada CF.

On 23 February 2013, Botía put the visitors ahead at former side Barcelona, but in an eventual 2–1 loss. For the 2013–14 campaign, after 25 official appearances for the Andalusian team, he was loaned to Elche CF alongside teammates Manu del Moral and Miroslav Stevanović.

Botía's spell at the Estadio Martínez Valero ended prematurely on 3 May 2014, when he was ejected for kicking the ball at a Málaga CF player in a 0–1 home defeat and then confronted the referee, earning him a two-match suspension.

Olympiacos
On 1 August 2014, Botía joined Greek club Olympiacos F.C. on a four-year contract, for €2 million. He contributed 25 appearances all competitions comprised in his debut season, helping them win the double.

Botía was also regularly played in 2015–16, under new manager Marco Silva. On 25 October 2015, he scored both of his team's goals in a 2–1 away victory over Atromitos FC, becoming the club's first defender to achieve this since Avraam Papadopoulos two years earlier.

On 6 November 2016, Botía netted the opening goal of a 3–0 home defeat of Panathinaikos F.C. in the Derby of the eternal enemies. His contract was terminated by mutual consent on 4 May 2018.

Saudi Arabia
Botía became new manager Jorge Jesus' first signing for Al Hilal SFC on 26 June 2018, when the 29-year-old agreed to a two-year deal with the option for a further season. On his debut on 18 August, the club won the Saudi Super Cup with a 2–1 win over Al Ittihad F.C. at Loftus Road, London.

After the Riyadh-based side finished runners-up to Al Nassr FC, Botía left for Al Wehda FC also of the Saudi Professional League. He scored the equaliser on his debut, a 2–1 home loss to Abha Club on 30 August.

International career

On 7 February 2007, Botía was summoned for the Spain under-19 team, being an unused squad member at the "XXXIII International Atlantic Cup". Almost exactly two years later he received his first under-21 callup, for a friendly with Norway.

On 25 August 2011, Botía was selected for the first time to the full side by manager Vicente del Bosque, for games against Chile and Liechtenstein. He was included in Luis Milla's squad for the 2012 Summer Olympics, playing the last two matches against Honduras and Morocco as the team were eliminated without scoring a goal.

Personal life
In 2017, Botía began a relationship with Eleni Foureira, a singer who represented Cyprus at the 2018 Eurovision Song Contest.

Career statistics

Honours
Barcelona
La Liga: 2008–09

Olympiacos
Super League Greece: 2014–15, 2015–16, 2016–17
Greek Football Cup: 2014–15; Runner-up 2015–16

Al-Hilal
Saudi Super Cup: 2018

Spain U20
Mediterranean Games: 2009

Spain U21
UEFA European Under-21 Championship: 2011

References

External links

1989 births
Living people
Spanish footballers
Footballers from Murcia
Association football defenders
La Liga players
Segunda División B players
Tercera División players
FC Barcelona Atlètic players
FC Barcelona players
Sporting de Gijón players
Sevilla FC players
Elche CF players
Super League Greece players
Olympiacos F.C. players
Saudi Professional League players
Saudi First Division League players
Al Hilal SFC players
Al-Wehda Club (Mecca) players
Spain youth international footballers
Spain under-21 international footballers
Spain under-23 international footballers
Olympic footballers of Spain
Footballers at the 2012 Summer Olympics
Competitors at the 2009 Mediterranean Games
Mediterranean Games medalists in football
Mediterranean Games gold medalists for Spain
Spanish expatriate footballers
Expatriate footballers in Greece
Expatriate footballers in Saudi Arabia
Spanish expatriate sportspeople in Greece
Spanish expatriate sportspeople in Saudi Arabia